The Shire of Macedon Ranges is a region in Central Victoria, Australia, best known for its expansive native forests, iconic geographical attraction Hanging Rock, and thriving artisan food and wine industries. It is located in between the cities of Bendigo and Melbourne. In June 2018 the shire had a population of 49,388. It includes the towns of Gisborne, Gisborne South, Kyneton, Lancefield, Macedon, Malmsbury, Mount Macedon, New Gisborne, Riddells Creek, Romsey and Woodend.

The Shire is named after the region's major geographical feature, the Macedon Ranges. It has become one of Victoria's most popular tourist attractions and contains some of its most sought-after real estate.

It is governed and administered by the Macedon Ranges Shire Council; its seat of local government and administrative centre is located at the council headquarters in Kyneton, it also has service centres located in Gisborne, Romsey and Woodend. .

Macedon Ranges was one of the highest-rated areas in Australia in the Quality of Life Index 2008. It was the highest rated in Victoria (outside Melbourne), and was 13th of 590 Australian local government areas.

Council

Current composition
The Shire of Macedon Ranges was formed in 1995 from the amalgamation of the Shire of Romsey, Shire of Gisborne, Shire of Newham and Woodend, and most of the Shire of Kyneton.

The council is composed of three wards and nine councillors, with three councillors per ward elected to represent each ward.

Local government areas of Victoria (Australia)
Loddon Mallee (region)
 
North Central Victoria

Administration and governance
The Council meets in the Council chambers at Gisborne, which is also the location of one of the Council's administrative centres. It also provides customer services at both its administrative centre in Kyneton, and its service centres in Gisborne, Romsey and Woodend.

Education
Gisborne Secondary College, the largest Secondary School in the shire, is located in Gisborne and provides both academic and vocational programs for over 1000 students from across the Macedon Ranges. Kyneton Secondary College is Kyneton's state secondary school, along with Sacred Heart College (Catholic), and Braemar College east of Woodend (Ecumenical, co-educational) as the largest non-government secondary schools in the shire. In addition to a range of primary schools across the shire, Candlebark Primary School and Alice Miller High School (whose principal is John Marsden, renowned Australian author and educator) provide alternative education options.

Townships and localities
The 2021 census, the shire had a population of 51,458 up from 46,100 in the 2016 census

^ - Territory divided with another LGA
* - Not noted in 2016 Census
# - Not noted in 2021 Census

References

External links
Macedon Ranges Shire Council official website
Residents association
Metlink local public transport map
Link to Land Victoria interactive maps
 Gisborne & Mount Macedon Districts Historical Society